Uperoleia is a genus of frogs in the family Myobatrachidae. They are native to northern and eastern Australia and southern lowlands of New Guinea. These are small squat frogs, more commonly known as "toadlets". They have glandular skin, often with a pair of raised glands behind each eye, or on the flanks.

They have bumpy, rough skin giving them the appearance of a small toad, hence the name "toadlet", although they are often called "gungans" in Queensland. There are two distinct types of calls—Uperoleia species make either a "click" or a "squelch". Generally, the "clicking" Uperoleia have long thin inguinal glands that run along the dorsal surface, while the "squelching" Uperoleia have round inguinal glands restricted to the posterior half of the dorsal surface. It is unusual to find more than one species of "clickers" or "squelchers" in the same location, although finding one of each is quite frequent in northern Australia. The species in this genus show great similarities in body shape and colouration making them difficult to tell apart. Call analysis is often required to confirm identification. This genus is the largest of any in the family Myobatrachidae.

Clicking Uperoleia include U. glandulosa, U. aspera, U. minima, U. trachyderma, U. lithomoda, U. littlejohni, U. altissima, U. mimula, and U. rugosa.  The squelching Uperoleia include U. russelli, U. saxatilis, U. talpa, U. borealis, U. crassa, and U. inundata.  The eastern species U. laevigata, U. fusca, U. tyleri, and U. martini are also squelchers, but are distantly related.  The species U. mjobergi, U. micromeles, U. micra, and U. daviesae are distinct from these other groups.

Species
Following the Amphibian Species of the World, there are 29 species:

Note that the AmphibiaWeb recognizes the small-headed toadlet (Uperoleia capitulata ), a species that the Amphibian Species of the World, following Catullo and Keogh (2014), treats as a synonym of the wrinkled toadlet (Uperoleia rugosa).

References

 
Myobatrachidae
Amphibian genera
Taxa named by John Edward Gray